This is a list of tombstone lieutenant generals in the United States Marine Corps. A tombstone promotion transferred an officer to the retired list with the rank of the next higher grade.

From 1925 to 1959, Marine Corps officers could retire with a tombstone promotion to the rank but not the pay of the next higher grade if they were specially commended for the performance of duty in actual combat before the end of World War II. The original 1925 authorization was limited to officers too old to be promoted to a higher grade, so those holding the highest grade of major general did not qualify for a tombstone promotion until 1938, when eligibility was expanded to cover any officer with a qualifying combat citation. In October 1941, retiring major general James C. Breckinridge received a tombstone promotion to lieutenant general, the first Marine to achieve three-star rank. Retired major generals John A. Lejeune and John T. Myers were advanced to lieutenant general in April 1942, after tombstone promotions were extended to officers who retired before 1938.

Dozens of major generals retired with a tombstone promotion to lieutenant general. By January 1, 1957, 18 of the 21 living retired lieutenant generals—86 percent—had never served in that rank on active duty. Congress stopped all tombstone promotions effective November 1, 1959.

List of U.S. Marine Corps tombstone lieutenant generals
Each entry lists the officer's name, date appointed major general, date retired and advanced to lieutenant general, and other biographical notes.

A major general's date of rank, as listed in the Register of the Commissioned and Warrant Officers of the United States Navy and Marine Corps, often predated his actual date of appointment by several years. This was because the Navy had only one flag grade, rear admiral, which was divided into a lower half and upper half. Rear admirals advanced automatically from lower to upper half by seniority instead of selection, so the date of rank for a rear admiral of the upper half remained the date he was promoted to rear admiral of the lower half. Since rear admirals of the upper half ranked with major generals and the lower half with brigadier generals, the Officer Personnel Act of 1947 assigned major generals the same dates of rank they held as brigadier generals.

Legislative history
The following list of Congressional legislation concerns tombstone promotions to the grade of lieutenant general in the United States Marine Corps. Each entry lists an act of Congress, its citation in the United States Statutes at Large, and a summary of the act's relevance.

Each entry lists an act of Congress, its citation in the United States Statutes at Large, and a summary of the act's relevance.

See also
 Tombstone promotion
 Lieutenant general (United States)
 List of United States Marine Corps tombstone generals
 List of United States Marine Corps lieutenant generals on active duty before 1960
 List of United States Navy tombstone vice admirals
 List of United States Coast Guard tombstone vice admirals

Notes

References
 

Lists of American military personnel
United States Marine Corps tombstone lieutenant generals
United States Marine Corps lists
United States Marine Corps generals